Mashhad and Kalat is a constituency for the Islamic Consultative Assembly.

Elections

10th term

References 

Electoral districts of Iran
Deputies of Mashhad and Kalat